Baron Newton, of Newton-in-Makerfield in the County Palatine of Lancaster, is a title in the Peerage of the United Kingdom.  It was created in 1892 for the Conservative politician William Legh, who had earlier represented Lancashire South and Cheshire East in the House of Commons.

Overview 
Both his son, the second Baron, and his great-grandson, the fourth Baron, were Conservative government ministers.  the title is held by the latter's eldest son, the fifth Baron, who succeeded in 1992.

The family seat is Laughton Park Farm, near Lewes, East Sussex. The ancestral seat was Lyme Park, near Disley, Cheshire.  It was given to the National Trust in 1946 by the third Baron Newton.

Barons Newton (1892)
William John Legh, 1st Baron Newton (1828–1898)
Thomas Wodehouse Legh, 2nd Baron Newton (1857–1942)
Richard William Davenport Legh, 3rd Baron Newton (1888–1960)
Peter Richard Legh, 4th Baron Newton (1915–1992)
Richard Thomas Legh, 5th Baron Newton (b. 1950)

The heir apparent is the present holder's son Piers Richard Legh (b. 1979)

Arms

Notes

References
Kidd, Charles, Williamson, David (editors). Debrett's Peerage and Baronetage (1990 edition). New York: St Martin's Press, 1990, 

Baronies in the Peerage of the United Kingdom
Noble titles created in 1892
Noble titles created for UK MPs
1892 establishments in the United Kingdom